Falcon 9 prototypes were experimental flight test reusable rockets that performed vertical takeoffs and landings. The project was privately funded by SpaceX, with no funds provided by any government until later on. Two prototypes were built, and both were launched from the ground.

The earliest prototype was Grasshopper. It was announced in 2011 and began low-altitude, low-velocity hover/landing testing in 2012. A second prototype of Falcon 9 was the larger and more capable Falcon 9 Reusable Development Vehicle (F9R Dev, also known as F9R Dev1) based on the Falcon 9 v1.1 launch vehicle. It was tested at higher altitudes and was capable of much higher velocity but was never tested at high velocity. The F9R Dev1 vehicle was built in 2013–2014 and made its first low-altitude flight test on 17 April 2014; it was lost during a three-engine test at the McGregor test site on 22 August 2014, which ended the low-velocity test program. Further expansion of the flight test envelope for the reusable rocket was moved to descending Falcon 9 boosters that had been used on orbital flight trajectories on commercial orbital flights of the Falcon 9.

The Grasshopper and F9R Dev tests were fundamental to the development of the reusable Falcon 9 and Falcon Heavy rockets, which require vertical landings of the near-empty Falcon 9 and Falcon Heavy first-stage booster tanks and engine assemblies. The Grasshopper and the F9R Dev tests led into a series of high-altitude, high-speed controlled-descent tests of post-mission (spent) Falcon 9 booster stages that accompanied the commercial Falcon 9 missions since September 2013. The latter eventually resulted in the first successful booster landing on 21 December 2015.

History

Grasshopper first became known publicly in the third quarter of 2011, when space journalists first wrote about it after analyzing space launch regulations of the Federal Aviation Administration.

Shortly thereafter, SpaceX confirmed the existence of the test vehicle development program, and projected it would begin the Grasshopper flight test program in 2012.

At the time, testing was expected to take up to three years and the initial FAA permit allows up to 70 suborbital launches per year.
A half-acre concrete launch facility was constructed to support the test flight program. In September 2012, SpaceX announced that they have requested FAA approval to increase the altitude of some of the initial test flights. Looking forward to the next year, CEO Musk said in November 2012:  "Over the next few months, we’ll gradually increase the altitude and speed. ... I do think there probably will be some craters along the way; we’ll be very lucky if there are no craters. Vertical landing is an extremely important breakthrough — extreme, rapid reusability."

In May 2013, SpaceX announced that the higher-altitude, higher-velocity part of the Grasshopper flight test program would be done at Spaceport America near Las Cruces, New Mexico—and not at the Federal Government's adjacent White Sands Missile Range facility as previously planned—and signed a three-year lease for land and facilities at the recently operational spaceport. SpaceX indicated in May 2013 that they did not yet know how many jobs might move from Texas to New Mexico.

Description

Grasshopper 
The landing gear was fixed.

As Elon Musk stated, Grasshopper could land on Earth with the accuracy of a helicopter.

F9R Dev1 

F9R Dev1 was constructed out of the used first-stage tank of the Falcon 9 v1.1, so it was 160-foot tall, nearly 50% longer than the first Grasshopper. The landing legs were retractable by design, with a telescoping piston mounted on an A-frame. The legs had less weight than on the first Grasshopper. The F9R Dev1 had a different engine bay than the first Grasshopper vehicle.

The F9R Dev1 vehicle in Texas was intended to take off and accelerate with three engines—as the test flight never needs the full thrust to take off a fully loaded Falcon 9 with an orbital payload—while completing the descent and landing with only one engine. The original Grasshopper had flown exclusively with only a single Merlin 1D engine in place, the center engine which is now used to complete the last phase of the deceleration and vertical landing on full-scale Falcon 9 rockets.

F9R Dev2 (never flown) 

In September 2014, following the destruction of the F9R Dev1, SpaceX changed the plans, so the F9R Dev2 vehicle would fly first in McGregor for low-altitude testing. The initial FAA permit to fly the Falcon 9 Reusable Development Vehicle at McGregor in Texas was open until February 2015.

On 19 February 2015 SpaceX announced that the F9R Dev2 would be discontinued.

During April 2015, SpaceX performed tanking tests on the In-Flight Abort rocket on the Vandenberg Air Force Base SLC-4E. Since this rocket only had three Merlin 1D engines, and the New Mexico site was to have been used for testing the returned first stages, it was speculated that the discontinued F9R Dev2 was re-purposed as the launch vehicle in the In-Flight Abort Test.

In May 2015, a press article stated that due to the technical success of many aspects of the booster rocket landing attempts on the sea and on the ASDS, SpaceX was planning on using the New Mexico site for testing the returned stages.

Flight testing

Grasshopper flight tests 
The first Falcon 9 prototype, Grasshopper, made a total of eight test flights between September 2012 and October 2013.  All eight flights were from the McGregor, Texas test facility.

Grasshopper made its eighth, and final, test flight on October 7, 2013, flying to an altitude of  before making its eighth successful vertical landing. The Grasshopper test vehicle is now retired.

From the announcement in 2011 until 2014, SpaceX has achieved each of the schedule milestones that they publicly announced. SpaceX said in February 2012 that they were planning several vertical-takeoff, vertical-landing (VTVL) test flights during 2012, and confirmed in June 2012 that they continued to plan to make the first test flight within the next couple of months.

F9R Dev1 flight tests 
The Falcon 9 Reusable Development Vehicle, or F9R Dev, was announced in October 2012. F9R Dev1 was initially named, since late 2012 until early 2014, as Grasshopper v1.1. In March 2013 Musk said that SpaceX hoped to reach hypersonic speed before the end of 2013. In March 2013, it was announced that the second Grasshopper-class suborbital flight vehicle would be constructed out of the Falcon 9 v1.1 first-stage tank that had been used for qualification testing in Texas at the SpaceX Rocket Development and Test Facility prior to March.

The F9R Dev1 was built on the much longer Falcon 9 v1.1 first-stage tank, and with retractable landing legs.

The F9R Dev1 vehicle's fifth flight on 22 August 2014 was also its final one. Anomalous sensor data from the vehicle during its ascent and subsequent deviation from nominal flight trajectory triggered the flight termination system, leading to the destruction of F9R-Dev1. No injuries or near-injuries were reported and an FAA representative was present during the test. Video from the accident was released by CBS and multiple images from the accident were posted on social media.

Falcon 9 post-mission landing tests

In 2013, SpaceX moved to using their mainstream Falcon 9 vehicles for VTVL testing, in addition to their existing tests with flying test vehicles. In March 2013, SpaceX announced that, beginning with the first flight of the stretch version of the Falcon 9 launch vehicle—the sixth flight overall of Falcon 9 (then anticipated for summer 2013), every first stage would be instrumented and equipped as a controlled descent test vehicle. SpaceX attempted numerous over-water landings, both over the sea, resulting in soft landings into the water, and onto specialized Autonomous Spaceport Drone Ships: barges modified to be landing platforms. None were completely successful.

SpaceX eventually succeeded in landing a production vertical-landing rocket on land in late 2015. The first attempt to land the first stage of the Falcon 9 on land, near its launch site, occurred on Falcon 9 Flight 20, on 21 December 2015. The landing was successful, and the first stage of the Falcon 9 Full Thrust vehicle was recovered. By May 27, 2016, SpaceX had successfully completed three first-stage landings on a drone ship at sea.

See also

References

External links

Collected videos
Video of 1st test launch, 21 September 2012
Video of 2nd test launch, 1 November 2012
Video of 3rd test launch H=40m, 17 December 2012
Video of 4th test launch H=80m, 8 March 2013
Video of 5th test launch H=250m, 17 April 2013
Video of 6th test launch H=325m, 14 June 2013
Video of 7th test launch H=250m L=100m, 13 August 2013
Video of 8th test launch H=744m, 7 October 2013.  Final Grasshopper test flight.
Video of 9th test launch H=250m, 17 April 2014.  First F9R Dev1 test flight.
Video of 10th test launch H=1000m, 1 May 2014
Video of 13th test launch, 22 August 2014.  Final flight of F9R Dev1 as vehicle was destroyed after an anomaly occurred during the test flight.
Steve Jurvetson personal comments on the destruction of F9R Dev1, 23 September 2014, SPARK 2014 Keynote address, @58:05.  Jurvetson is a SpaceX board member and was present for the flight test on 22 August 2014.

Experimental rockets of the United States
SpaceX prototype vehicles
Suborbital spaceflight
Hopping spacecraft
2012 in robotics
VTVL rockets
Falcon 9